Karamah or Karama (Arabic, كرامة, 'dignity') may refer to:

Places
Al Karama, Dubai, UAE
Al Karama, United Arab Emirates, a former planned capital of UAE
Al-Karamah Subdistrict, Raqqa District, Syria
Al-Karamah, Raqqa Governorate, Syria
Al-Karamah, Tartus Governorate, Syria

Other uses
Alkarama, an independent Swiss-based human rights NGO
Al-Karamah SC, a Syrian football club

See also
Karameh (disambiguation), colloquial pronunciation
Karama (disambiguation)
Karamat (disambiguation)
Karami
Karam (disambiguation)
Dignity Party (Egypt) (Ḥizb al-Karāma), an Egyptian political party